

In mathematics, De Gua's theorem is a three-dimensional analog of the Pythagorean theorem named after Jean Paul de Gua de Malves. It states that if a tetrahedron has a right-angle corner (like the corner of a cube), then the square of the area of the face opposite the right-angle corner is the sum of the squares of the areas of the other three faces:

Generalizations

The Pythagorean theorem and de Gua's theorem are special cases of a general theorem about n-simplices with a right-angle corner, proved by P. S. Donchian and H. S. M. Coxeter in 1935. This, in turn, is a special case of a yet more general theorem by Donald R. Conant and William A. Beyer (1974), which can be stated as follows.

Then

where  is the k-dimensional volume of U and the sum is over all subsets  with exactly k elements.

which is de Gua's theorem.

The generalisation of de Gua's theorem to n-simplices with right-angle corners can also be obtained as a special case from the Cayley–Menger determinant formula.

History

Jean Paul de Gua de Malves (1713–85) published the theorem in 1783, but around the same time a slightly more general version was published by another French mathematician, Charles de Tinseau d'Amondans (1746–1818), as well. However the theorem had also  been known much earlier to Johann Faulhaber (1580–1635) and René Descartes (1596–1650).

See also 

 Vector area and projected area
 Bivector

Notes

References
 
 Sergio A. Alvarez: Note on an n-dimensional Pythagorean theorem, Carnegie Mellon University.
 De Gua's Theorem, Pythagorean theorem in 3-D — Graphical illustration and related properties of the tetrahedron.

Further reading 
  Proof of de Gua's theorem and of generalizations to arbitrary tetrahedra and to pyramids.
  Application of de Gua's theorem for proving a special case of Heron's formula.

Theorems in geometry
Euclidean geometry